Haldane Alfred Griggs (November 27, 1900 – December 29, 1987) was a National Football League running back. He played five games for the Akron Indians. He was born in Toronto, Ontario, Canada.

External links
 NFL.com

1900 births
1987 deaths
Sportspeople from Toronto
Canadian players of American football
American football halfbacks
Butler Bulldogs football players
Akron Indians players